Team of the Year may refer to:

BBC Sports Personality of the Year Team Award
Canadian Press Team of the Year Award
GPA Gaelic Team of the Year
IRB International Sevens Team of the Year
IRB International Team of the Year
J.League Team of the Year
Laureus World Sports Award for Team of the Year
PFA Team of the Year
PFA Scotland Team of the Year
PWI Tag Team of the Year
UEFA Team of the Year
USOC Team of the Year
World Rugby Team of the Year

See also

 Team of the Decade (disambiguation)
 Team of the century